Canigao is an islet located in the Philippines, in the municipality of Matalom, Leyte. The area is known for abundant fishing grounds and scenic coral reef areas suitable for diving.

Features
Canigao Island is uninhabited, featuring a lighthouse as its only significant man-made structure.  The beaches have white sand, with tropical sea creatures and extensive coral reef in the surrounding waters. The climate is tropical and similar to that found in other areas of the Philippine islands. These natural features often attract tourists and scuba divers, who arrive at the island by traveling from Matalom (in the province of Leyte).
 
The western and northern part of Canigao island is placed under nature protection as a sanctuary. Due to this, activities such as swimming, diving, fishing, snorkeling, and boating in the protected areas are limited by law.

Gallery

See also

 Desert island
 List of islands

References

External links

 Canigao Island | Metro Tacloban

Islands of Leyte (province)
Uninhabited islands of the Philippines
Beaches of the Philippines